Cham Mehr-e Bala (also Romanized as Cham Mehr-e Bālā; also known as Chambīr, Cham-ī-Mīr, Cham-ī-Shīr, and Cham Mehr) is a village in Jayedar Rural District, in the Central District of Pol-e Dokhtar County, Lorestan Province, Iran. At the 2006 census, its population was 649, in 142 families.

References 

Towns and villages in Pol-e Dokhtar County